Maryland or Marimland is a territory between Vütla (Vetluga) and Viče (Vyatka) rivers, inhabited by Mari people. The region includes the Mari El Republic and parts of the Nizhny Novgorod Oblast, the Kostroma Oblast and the Kirov Oblast.

Geography of Mari El
Historical regions in Russia